TNT Series (TNT Séries, with an accent, in Brazil) is a Latin American pay television channel which is focused on airing television series. It is operated by Warner Bros. Discovery. Launched as a spin-off of Latin American subscription network TNT, it premiered in Argentina on 10 March 2015 replacing Infinito, whose programming was moved to truTV, whilst it was launched on the rest of Latin American countries on 17 March 2015. In Brazil, it was launched separately on 24 April 2015.

Programming

Current 
 CSI
 CSI: Miami
 CSI: New York
 ER
 Enchufe.tv
 The Mentalist

Former 

 Pretty Little Liars 
 Devil's Playground
 Heroes
 Constantine
 Continuum
 Falling Skies
 Justified
 Law & Order: Criminal Intent
 Leverage
 Major Crimes
 Murder in the First
 Shameless
 Suits
 Under the Dome
 Boss
 The Carrie Diaries
 Californication
 The Borgias
 Crossbones
 The Lying Game
 The Last Ship
 Mossad 101
 Limitless
 Rick and Morty
 Mr. Robot
 Brooklyn 9-9
 Rizzoli & Isles
 Lost
 The Closer

References

External links 
  
  

 
Television channels and stations established in 2015
Spanish-language television stations
Portuguese-language television stations in Brazil